(English: "Discovery of Sushi") is a Pan-European sushi making competition, part of the biennial Sirha 'world hospitality and food service event' trade show held in January at Eurexpo in Lyon, France.

The competition was first held in 2003 and usually accepts representatives from about twelve countries. To be eligible for the contest, entrants must be studying in a European hospitality school, be under the age of 22 years on the day of the competition, and not be of Japanese nationality.

 comprises three stages, judged by a jury of professionals:

1. Nigiri Express Speed: prepare, under a time limit, a maximum amount of nigiri
2. Sushi Nippon Technicality: prepare a plate of traditional nigiri and maki
3. European Roll Creativity: invent an original recipe of maki (roll) with ingredients from the entrant's home country 

Winning schools are:

 2003:  (Paris, France) 
 2005:  (Nice, France)
 2007: （Warsaw, Poland）
 2009:  (France) The 2009 competition awarded podium places to France, Germany and Belgium.

References

External links 
 Découverte du Sushi

American fusion cuisine
Japanese cuisine
Sushi
Cooking competitions in France